A protocol implementation conformance statement (PICS) is a structured document which asserts which specific requirements are met by a given implementation of a protocol standard. It is often completed as a record of formal protocol conformance test results, and some automated testing systems machine-author a PICS as output. A potential buyer or user of the implementation can consult the PICS to determine if it meets their requirements.

PICS may be used with TTCN-3.

References

External links
 Example proforma PICS from ETSI

Statements
Network protocols
Software testing